Gizdodo is a delicacy made of gizzard and Dodo (plantain), this is a side-dish eaten at home or occasions.

Overview 
The combination is made using plantain,gizzard of chicken,spices, Onion, bell pepper and rodo (habenero pepper) amongst others. Carrot can also be added.

The plantain and gizzard are fried separately in a frypan, afterward the two are added to sauce made from the remaining ingredients (chopped onion, sliced pepper, spices, Maggi cubes, salt etc.). Gizdodo can be served alone, eaten with rice or spaghetti.

See also 
 Nigerian cuisine

References 

African cuisine
Nigerian cuisine
Plantain dishes
Fried foods
Street food
Foods